The 2021–22 Hong Kong FA Cup is the 47th edition of the Hong Kong FA Cup. 8 teams entered this edition. The competition is only open to clubs who participate in the 2021–22 Hong Kong Premier League, with lower division sides entering the Junior Division, a separate competition. 

The champion will receive HK$100,000 in prize money and the runners-up will receive HK$40,000. The MVP of the final will receive a HK$10,000 bonus.

Since the previous edition of the FA Cup was cancelled due to COVID-19 pandemic in Hong Kong, Eastern, the champions of the 2019–20 Hong Kong FA Cup still remains as the defending champions of the competition.

Calendar

Effects of the COVID-19 pandemic 
On 5 January 2022, the Hong Kong government announced a tightening of social distancing measures between 7 January to 20 January in order to control the Omicron outbreak. Public recreation facilities, such as football pitches, were closed and members of the public were barred from gathering in groups of more than two, making it impossible for the season to continue. The Hong Kong Football Association announced on the same day that it would also postpone any scheduled matches in the successive two week period.

After the measures were extended several times in the successive weeks, the government announced on 22 February that it would extend the measures until 20 April, making it near impossible to complete the season before most player contracts end on 31 May. The HKFA held an emergency meeting with the clubs on 25 February, after which it was determined that the remainder of the season would be cancelled.

Bracket

Bold = winner
* = after extra time, = penalty shootout score

Fixtures and results

Quarter-finals

Semi-finals

Final

Top scorers

References

2021–22
FA Cup
2021–22 domestic association football cups
Hong Kong
Hong Kong
Association football events curtailed and voided due to the COVID-19 pandemic